Yuxarı Çardaqlar (also, Yuxarı Çardaxlar, Chardakhlo, Yukhari Chardakhly, Yukhary Chardakhlar, and Yukhary-Chardakhly) is a village and municipality in the Zaqatala Rayon of Azerbaijan. It has a population of 2,083. 

The castle of Parigala is located in this village.

References 

Populated places in Zaqatala District